Freedom Square may refer to:
Freedom Square (Sukhumi), Republic of Abkhazia / Autonomous Republic of Abkhazia (Georgia)
Freedom Square, Yerevan, Armenia
Freedom Square, Baku, Azerbaijan
Freedom Square, Belo Horizonte, Brazil (Praça da Liberdade)
Freedom Square, Tallinn, Estonia (Vabaduse väljak)
Freedom Square, Batumi, Georgia
Freedom Square, Tbilisi, Georgia
Freedom Square, Budapest, Hungary (Szabadság Tér)
Azadi Square, also known as Freedom Square, Tehran, Iran
Freedom Square, Valletta, Malta
Freedom Square, Nikšić, Montenegro
Freedom Square in Bydgoszcz, Poland
Námestie Slobody, Bratislava, Slovakia (English "Freedom Square", formerly "Gottwald Square") 
Freedom Square (Kharkiv), Ukraine (formerly "Dzerzhinsky Square")
Freedom Square, Kew Gardens Hills, New York, USA

See also
Liberty Square (disambiguation)
Tahrir Square (disambiguation)
Freedom Monument (disambiguation)
Merdeka Square (disambiguation)
Independence Square (disambiguation)